Victoria Road is a main road near the west shore of Hong Kong Island in Hong Kong connecting Kennedy Town and Wah Fu and an alternative connection of Pok Fu Lam Road. It begins north with Belcher's Street in Kennedy Town and goes along Mount Davis, Sandy Bay, Telegraph Bay and Waterfall Bay and reaches in Kellett Bay.

History
The road opened in 1897, the year of Queen Victoria's Diamond Jubilee, celebrating the 60th year of her reign. A stone was laid by Governor Robinson and the road was named Victoria Jubilee Road (域多利慶典道). The road was without any surfacing and only access to Chinese public cemetery in Kellett Bay. In 1903, Hong Kong Government erected a stone at the road in Kennedy Town to mark the boundary of Victoria City. In the 1910s, the road was expanded and renamed to Victoria Road. In the 1960s, for the construction of Wah Fu Estate, the road became a standard road of concrete. In the 2000s, the section near Cyberport was improved.

Notable buildings
The medical faculty of the University of Hong Kong
Baguio Villa
Former Victoria Road Detention Centre aka. Mount Davis Concentration Camp (摩星嶺集中營), which was used by the Special Branch of the Royal Hong Kong Police Force to hold political prisoners during the 1967 Leftist riots. The compound is listed as a Grade III historic building. Currently the building has been renovated and has been integrated into the Hong Kong campus of the University of Chicago.
 Villa Cecil, the residential complex home to billionaire Cecil Chao
 Hong Kong Chinese Christian Churches Union Pok Fu Lam Road Cemetery, a cemetery is managed by The Hong Kong Chinese Christian Churches Union. It was built in 1882.

See also
 List of places named after Queen Victoria
 List of streets and roads in Hong Kong

References

External links

Google Maps of Victoria Road

 

Roads designated in 1897
Roads on Hong Kong Island
Kennedy Town
Mount Davis, Hong Kong
Sandy Bay, Hong Kong
Telegraph Bay
Waterfall Bay, Hong Kong
Kellett Bay